Desperately Seeking Susan is a 1985 American comedy-drama film directed by Susan Seidelman and starring Rosanna Arquette, Aidan Quinn and Madonna. Set in New York City, the plot involves the interaction between two women – a bored housewife and a bohemian drifter – linked by various messages in the personals section of a newspaper.

The film was Madonna's first major screen role and also provided early roles for a number of other well-known performers, such as John Turturro, Giancarlo Esposito, Laurie Metcalf and Steven Wright. The screenplay was written by Leora Barish, and is said to have been given an uncredited rewrite by Craig Bolotin. Desperately Seeking Susan was a commercial success and ended as the fifth-highest grossing film of the year grossing $27.3 million in the United States. The film received predominantly positive reviews, and both Arquette and Madonna's acting were critically acclaimed. 

Desperately Seeking Susan is noted for its impact in 1980s fashion, especially the young female audience. Movie's costume was influenced in part, by Madonna's own early style. The film was also noted as a representation of yuppie culture. Some critics labeled Desperately Seeking Susan as one of the best US films of the year, including Vincent Canby from The New York Times, and eventually, of the decade by publications such as NME and Rolling Stone. Many others have labeled it a cult classic of its decade.

Plot 
Roberta Glass, an unfulfilled housewife from Fort Lee, New Jersey, is fascinated by the messages between lovers Susan Thomas and Jim Dandy in the personals section of a New York City tabloid. She's particularly drawn to a section from Jim with the headline "Desperately Seeking Susan," which seeks a rendezvous in Battery Park. Meanwhile, in an Atlantic City hotel, the itinerant Susan reads the section after a tryst with mobster Bruce Meeker. She steals a pair of ornate Egyptian earrings from his coat before departing. The sinister Wayne Nolan notices Susan's embellished tuxedo jacket as she leaves. Arriving in New York City, Susan dons one of the earrings and stashes the other in her suitcase in a Port Authority locker. She asks to stay with her friend Crystal, a magician's assistant at the Magic Club, and learns that Meeker was killed at the hotel.

Hoping to spot the lovers, Roberta goes to Battery Park and sees Jim reunite with Susan before leaving with his band for Buffalo. Later, Roberta follows Susan to a vintage store and watches her trade in her jacket before losing sight of her. Roberta buys the jacket and finds Susan's locker key in its pocket. She posts another "Desperately Seeking Susan" column to meet with Susan and return the key. Meanwhile, Jim becomes concerned about the column and Susan's connection to Meeker's death. He asks his best friend Dez to check on her.

Waiting for Susan at Battery Park and wearing her jacket, Roberta is accosted by Nolan, who mistakes her for Susan because she's blonde and wearing the distinctive jacket. Susan spots Roberta, but can't reach her as police chase her for not paying her taxicab fare. Dez arrives on a moped and rescues Roberta, who falls and hits her head, causing her to lose her memory and her bag. Dez believes she is Susan and finds the locker key, taking her to the Port Authority to collect Susan's suitcase. There, Roberta finds the other earring, and Dez offers her to stay at his apartment for one night.

Believing that she must be Susan, Roberta retraces Susan's steps with Nolan in pursuit. She eventually arrives at the Magic Club, narrowly missing Susan who has been released from jail and discovered that her suitcase is gone. Roberta is then hired as Crystal's replacement. After Roberta's disastrous first performance, Nolan attacks her, demanding the earrings. He manages to escape as the police arrive. Roberta hits her head again, but this time, she regains her memory. Unfortunately, she's mistaken for a prostitute and arrested.

Meanwhile, Gary, Roberta's husband who is revealed to be in the midst of a casual affair, searches for her. He finds his way to the vintage store and is put in touch with Susan. She believes that Roberta and Dez are connected to Meeker's death and want to frame her. Susan arranges to meet Gary at a dance club and accompanies him home where they get high. Roberta calls from jail, but hangs up when Susan and Gary answer. After calling Dez to bail her out, they discover that his apartment has been ransacked by Nolan. Roberta and Dez end up sleeping together.

At Gary's house, Susan sees a television report about Meeker and Nolan stealing the earrings, which once belonged to Nefertiti. She realizes the truth from Roberta's diary and posts a column to meet her at the Magic Club. Dez attacks an intruder in his apartment who turns out to be Jim. He confesses to his relationship with "Susan" as Roberta slips away. She reads the column, as do Jim and Dez. They arrive at the Magic Club along with Gary, his sister Leslie, and Nolan. During her act, Roberta recognizes Nolan, who escapes backstage. Dez leaves as Roberta tries to explain the events of her disappearance to Gary, finally voicing her unhappiness and ending their marriage. Nolan threatens Susan at gunpoint, but is knocked out by Roberta. There, Roberta and Susan finally meet each other for the first time.

Later, Roberta finds Dez in a projection booth at the movie theater where he works. She introduces herself once again, and they kiss as Jim and Susan reunite in the theater below. In the closing frames, Roberta and Susan are celebrated as heroes in the newspaper and credited with returning the stolen earrings.

Cast 

 Rosanna Arquette as Roberta Glass
 Aidan Quinn as Dez
 Robert Joy as Jim Dandy, Susan's boyfriend
 Mark Blum as Gary Glass, Roberta's husband
 Laurie Metcalf as Leslie Glass, Roberta's sister-in-law
 Will Patton as Wayne Nolan
 Madonna as Susan Thomas
 Anna Levine as Crystal
 Peter Maloney as Ian, a magician
 Steven Wright as Larry Stillman D.D.S.
 John Turturro as Ray, the master of ceremonies at the Magic Club
 Anne Carlisle as Victoria
 José Angel Santana (as Jose Santana) as Boutique Owner
 Giancarlo Esposito as Street Vendor
 Richard Hell as Bruce Meeker

Seidelman employed a wide range of artists in small appearances, including comedian Rockets Redglare as a taxi driver; former member of the Shirts Annie Golden as a band singer; performance artist Ann Magnuson as a cigarette girl; musician and painter John Lurie as the neighbor saxophonist;  La Mama and Living Theatre member Shirley Stoler as a jail matron; Ambitious Lovers member Arto Lindsay as the newspaper clerk who places the "seeking" ads; and future Seinfeld-writer Carol Leifer as a party guest. Other notable appearances include actors Richard Edson as a man with newspapers, Victor Argo as Sgt. Taskal, Kim Chan as a park bum, and Michael Badalucco as a guy from Brooklyn. Triplets Eddy, David and Robert make an uncredited cameo as themselves.

Production 
The filmmakers initially wanted Diane Keaton and Goldie Hawn to play Roberta and Susan, but the director decided to cast newcomers Arquette and Madonna instead and the studio wanted the movie to have younger actors in order to appeal to younger filmgoers. Bruce Willis was up for the role of Dez and Melanie Griffith was up for the role of Susan. Madonna barely obtained the role over Ellen Barkin and Jennifer Jason Leigh. Suzanne Vega also auditioned for the role.

The Statue of Liberty can be seen in the movie when it was still covered in scaffolding during its two-year renovation. Costume designer Santo Loquasto designed Susan's distinctive jacket (supposedly first worn by Jimi Hendrix), basis of the plot of mistaken identity.

The movie was inspired in part by the movie Céline et Julie vont en bateau (Céline and Julie Go Boating) (1974). It also has an alternate ending included on the DVD, in which Susan and Roberta are invited to Egypt after helping return the earrings. They are depicted next to the pyramids on camels. Seidelman cut this scene, saying that it was unnecessary and audiences at the test screenings thought the film should have already ended much earlier (as explained on the DVD). The science fiction film The Time Travelers (1964) is playing in scenes 6 and 23 (melts at the movie's ending). All the scenes featuring Dez working as a projectionist were filmed at Bleecker Street Cinema. The scene with Roberta and Gary in their kitchen shows Roberta watching Alfred Hitchcock's Rebecca (1940).

The movie was filmed during the late summer and early fall of 1984, early in Madonna's rise to popularity, and was intended to be an R-rated feature. After the success of her 1984–85 hits "Like a Virgin" and "Material Girl" from her Like a Virgin album, the movie was trimmed in content by Orion Pictures to get a PG-13 rating in order to also market the film to Madonna's teenage fanbase.

The interior and exterior shots of The Magic Club were filmed at the Audubon Ballroom in Washington Heights. Some scenes were filmed at Danceteria, a club that Madonna frequented and which gave her a start in the music business.

Separated-at-birth triplets Robert Shafran, Eddy Galland and David Kellman have a cameo role, reportedly at Madonna's personal invitation.

Soundtrack 
The soundtrack was released on both vinyl and CD together with the soundtrack to the film Making Mr. Right. The soundtrack does not feature any of the other songs in the film including Madonna's "Into the Groove", which can be found on the European 1985 re-release of Like a Virgin. The film captures the feel of the underground Bohemian/new wave scene of the early to mid-1980s New York City, a scene that helped Madonna get her big break in the music business. Madonna recorded a song for the movie, titled "Desperately Seeking Susan". It ended up not being used in the film, and a demo she just finished at the time called "Into the Groove" was used instead. The demo version can only be heard in the movie. The song was a huge commercial success but was not included on the film's soundtrack, despite being heard in the film, because licensing restrictions involving Madonna's record label prohibited her songs from being mixed in with other artists. The video for "Into the Groove" consists of clips from the film compiled by Doug Dowdle of Parallax Productions.

Reception

Box office 
The film was released on March 29, 1985 in the United States, and grossed $1,526,098 in its first weekend. It was a commercial success, making $27,398,584 in the United States. The film was released on September 6, 1985 in the United Kingdom, and grossed £1,175,133 in its first weekend. Its total gross in the United Kingdom was £2,331,907. It also became the most successful Orion Pictures film in Europe at that point.

Critical reception and accolades
On Rotten Tomatoes the film has rating of 84% based on 31 reviews. The site's critical consensus reads; "Desperately Seeking Susan works with its fairy tale depiction of New York and the fun, frothy chemistry generated by its two leads." On Metacritic it has a score of 71% based on reviews from 16 critics, indicating "generally favorable reviews".

In her review for The New Yorker, critic Pauline Kael referred to Madonna as "an indolent, trampy goddess." Roger Ebert of The Chicago Sun-Times gave the film 3 stars out of a possible 4, saying it was essentially a screwball comedy, which "bopped around New York, introducing us to unforgettable characters".

Both Rosanna Arquette and Madonna received generally critical acclaim for their portrayal of Roberta and Susan respectively. In Costume and Cinema (2001), professor of film studies, Sarah Street estimated it as arguably "Madonna's best film performance" further explaining that clothes had an important role. In similar remarks, film critics such as James Monaco deemed it "Madonna's best role", playing a character "loosely based on herself". Arquette won the BAFTA Award for Best Actress in a Supporting Role for her portrayal of Roberta and achieved a nomination for Best Actress in a Comedy or Musical in the Golden Globes. 

Some critics labeled Desperately Seeking Susan one of the best US films of the year, and eventually, the decade. An example is film critic Vincent Canby from The New York Times naming it one of the 10 best films of 1985. In 2022, Rolling Stone ranked the film among their 100 Greatest Movies of the 1980s, calling it "a classic of its particular era". In 2011, NME also ranked the film as one of the 25 Greatest '80s Movies. Time Out ranked it as one of the 100 Best Feminist Films of All Time in 2022.

Legacy

According to some authors, upon its release the film garnered cult status in some audiences, with Hadley Freeman from The Guardian referring to the movie as a "80s cult classic". The film also impacted the fashion of teenage girls, and scholars in film studies, including Sarah Street have used the film as an example of the connection of fashion and cinema industries. Tracey Lomrantz Lester from Glamour slightly referred to the movie as one of the best fashion films of the era, while Derek Blasberg picked it as his favorite film that best embodied the 1980s fashion. Movie's costume designer, Santo Loquasto reportedly sought inspiration for Susan's wardrobe in Madonna's own closet. In 2019, Laird Borrelli-Persson from Vogue stated, "fashion's so corporate these days, Desperately Seeking Susan reminds us that clothing is a personal signifier of identity connected to place and time." The style influenced other figures at some stage, like South African performer PJ Powers.

Writing for Washington Post in 1985, Paul Attanasio considered the film as "the first big yuppie movie of the '80s", and further explains that yuppies are "the first generation to grow up exclusively on mass-marketed culture". In 2017, Ben Reardon from Vice commented: "Desperately Seeking Susan defined the times and withstands performance after performance, and has been referenced, riffed on and re-rubbed by every designer and wannabe star till Doomsday." Kirk Ellis, from The Hollywood Reporter, said in 2019, the movie "could well usher in a whole new subgenre: New Wave screwball comedy".

Madonna's presence, "contributed significantly to its film success", and her character also "becomes a pivotal plot point". Author Alicia Malone also said, film director Susan Seidelman is probably best known for this film. Associate professor Diane Pecknold in American Icons (2006) believes the film produced a new idiomatic phrase considering the newspapers headlines ([...] Desperately Seeking).

Stage musical 
The film was developed into a stage musical that premiered at London's Novello Theatre on November 15, 2007, following previews from October 16, 2007. It features music and lyrics by Blondie and Deborah Harry, including a new song written especially for the show. The production was directed by Angus Jackson, with book and concept by Peter Michael Marino and sets and costumes by Tim Hatley. Produced by Susan Gallin, Ron Kastner, Mark Rubinstein and Old Vic productions, the musical starred Emma Williams as Susan, Kelly Price as Roberta, and Steven Houghton as Alex. Marino presented his solo comedy Desperately Seeking the Exit, which is based on his experiences, at the 2012 Edinburgh Festival Fringe.

See also 

 List of American films of 1985
 After Hours - 1985 black comedy thriller film with a similar theme
 Something Wild - 1986 action comedy film with a similar theme
 Who's That Girl - 1987 screwball comedy film with a similar theme

References

Book sources

External links 
 
 
 
 
 Desperately Seeking Susan – The Musical

1985 films
1985 comedy-drama films
1985 independent films
1985 romantic comedy films
1980s mystery comedy-drama films
1980s English-language films
1980s romantic comedy-drama films
American mystery comedy-drama films
American romantic comedy-drama films
Films about adultery in the United States
Films about amnesia
Films directed by Susan Seidelman
Films scored by Thomas Newman
Films set in a movie theatre
Films set in New York City
Films set in New Jersey
Films shot in New York City
Films shot in New Jersey
Orion Pictures films
1980s American films